The Canyon Athletic Association (CAA), previously known as the Arizona Charter Athletic Association, is an American non-profit regulatory organization for athletic competition among secondary schools located in Arizona. The CAA serves small non-traditional education institutions including charter schools, public schools, home school organizations and parochial schools. As of 2014, the CAA membership consisted of approximately 125 High Schools and Junior High Schools.

The CAA is not affiliated with the Arizona Interscholastic Association which also regulates high school sports in Arizona.

Members

High schools

 Academy of Building Industries
 Academy with Community Partners
 Adobe Mountain School
 Ajo High School
 American Leadership Academy
 Anthem Preparatory Academy
 Apache Trail High School
 Arizona Collegiate High School
 Arrowhead Christian Academy (Glendale)
 AZ Compass Preparatory School
 BASIS Chandler
 BASIS Mesa
 BASIS Peoria
 BASIS Phoenix
 BASIS Scottsdale
 Berean Academy
 Black Canyon High School
 Cambridge Preparatory Academy
 Canyon View Preparatory Academy
 Champion Schools
 Copper Point Schools
 Crestview College Preparatory High School
 Canyon State Academy
 Desert Garden Montessori
 Desert Heights Athletics
 Desert Hills High School
 Desert Marigold High School
 Desert Pointe Academy
 East Valley Athletes for Christ
 EdOptions High School
 Eduprize Gilbert Charter School
 El Dorado High School
 Estrella High School
 Foothills Academy
 Genesis Academy
 Gila Bend High School
 Gilbert Early College
 Girls Leadership Academy of Arizona
 Glenview College Prep High School
 Grand Canyon Preparatory Academy
 Harvest Preparatory Academy
 Heritage Academy - Laveen at Salt River High School
 Heritage Academy - Mesa
 Heritage Academy - Queen Creek
 Hillcrest Academy
 Imagine Prep at Superstition
 Imagine Prep at Surprise
 James Madison Preparatory School
 Jefferson Preparatory High School
 Leading Edge Academy
 Legacy High School
 LFPA Alta Mesa
 LFPA Gilbert
 Madison Highland Prep
 Maya High School
 Metro Tech High School
 Mission Heights Preparatory High School
 New Way Academy
 North Phoenix Preparatory High School
 NFL YET Academy
 Orme School
 Our Lady of Sorrows Academy
 Pan-American Charter School
 Paradise Valley Christian Preparatory
 Paragon Science Academy
 Peoria Accelerated High School
 Phoenix College Preparatory Academy
 Phoenix Collegiate Academy
 Phoenix School of Academic Excellence
 Polytechnic High School
 Precision High School
 Salt River High School
 Sequoia Charter School
 Sequoia Pathway Academy
 Skyline Prep High School
 Sonoran Science Academy
 South Pointe High School
 South Ridge High School
 Southgate Academy
 Southwest Leadership Academy
 Starshine Academy
 Summit High School
 Tesseract School
 Tri-City Christian Academy
 Tri-City College Prep
 Trinity Christian School
 Trivium Prep
 West Phoenix High School
 Western School of Science &Technology
 Westwind Preparatory Academy
 Wickenburg Christian Academy

Junior high schools

 Arrowhead Christian
 Academia Del Pueblo
 Academy Math / Science
 Academy Del Sol
 Ajo
 American Leadership
 ASU Prep (Phoenix)
 ASU Prep (Poly)
 Athlos Academy
 AZ Academy of Science
 AZ Compass
 BASIS Ahwatukee
 BASIS Chandler
 BASIS Mesa
 BASIS Peoria
 BASIS Phoenix
 Benjamin Franklin
 Bios Christian
 CFA - Phoenix
 Calibre Academy
 Cambridge Queen Creek
 Camelback Academy
 Candeo - Peoria
 Carden of Tucson
 Caurus Academy
 Copper Canyon
 Desert Garden Montessori
 Desert Heights
 Destiny Globe
 Dobson Academy
 Eagle Prep
 Eduprize Gilbert
 Eduprize Queen Creek
 Empower
 EVAC
 Foothills Academy
 George Gervin
 Gila Bend
 Gilbert Early College
 Grand Canyon Prep
 Hearn Academy
 Heritage Academy
 Heritage Elementary
 Imagine Camelback
 Imagine Coolidge
 Imagine Cortez Park
 Imagine Desert West
 Imagine East Mesa
 Imagine Superstition
 Imagine Surprise
 Imagine West Gilbert
 La Paloma - Central
 La Paloma - Lakeside
 LEA - Maricopa
 Leading Edge
 Legacy - Avondale
 Legacy - Casa Grande
 Legacy - Gilbert
 Legacy - Laveen
 Legacy - Maricopa
 Legacy - NW Tucson
 Legacy - Queen Creek
 Liberty Arts
 Math & Science Success
 Mosaica Prep
 New Way Learning Acad.
 NFL Yet
 Paradise Education
 Pathway Academy
 Patriot Academy
 PCA
 Phoenix Advantage
 Pioneer Prep
 PVC
 Quest
 Ridgeline
 Sabis International
 San Tan Charter School
 Science Success
 Sequoia
 Skyline Gila River
 South Pointe
 South Valley
 Starshine
 Tri-City Christian
 Vista Grove
 Wickenburg Christian

References

External links
 Official website

High school sports associations in the United States